Phrynocephalus theobaldi (common names: Theobald's toad-headed agama, snow lizard, and others) is a species of lizard in the family Agamidae. The species is endemic to Asia.

Etymology
The specific name, theobaldi, is in honor of British naturalist William Theobald.

Geographic range
P. theobaldi is found in eastern Turkestan, India (Kashmir and Ladakh), Nepal and western China (Xinjiang and southern Tibet).

Its type locality is "Lake Tso Moriri" = Tsho-marari, Rupshu, Ladakh.

Habitat
The preferred natural habitats of P. theobaldi are desert, grassland, and  shrubland.

Reproduction
P. theobaldi is viviparous.

References

Further reading
Barabanov, Andrei; Ananjeva, Natalia; Papenfuss, Theodore J.; Wang, Yuezhao (2002). "A new name for Phrynocephalus theobaldi orientalis Wang, Papenfuss & Zeng, 1999". Russian Journal of Herpetology. 9 (1): 80.
Boulenger GA (1885). Catalogue of the Lizards in the British Museum (Natural History). Second Edition. Volume I. ... Agamidæ. London: Trustees of the British Museum (Natural History). (Taylor and Francis, printers). xii + 436 pp. + Plates I-XXXII. (Phrynocephalus theobaldi, p. 373).
Boulenger GA (1890). The Fauna of British India, Including Ceylon and Burma. Reptilia and Batrachia. London: Secretary of State for India in Council. (Taylor and Francis, printers). xviii + 541 pp. (Phrynocephalus theobaldi, p. 153).
Das I (2002). A Photographi Guide to Snakes and other Reptiles of India. Sanibel Island, Florida: Ralph Curtis Books. 144 pp. . (Phrynocephalus theobaldi, p. 79).
Pang, Junfeng; Wang, Yuezhao; Zhong, Yang; Hoelzel, A. Rus; Papenfuss, Theodore J.; Zeng, Xiaomao; Ananjeva, Natalia B.; Zhang, Ya-ping (2003). "A phylogeny of Chinese species in the genus Phrynocephalus (Agamidae) inferred from mitochondrial DNA sequences". Molecular Phylogenetics and Evolution 27: 398–409.
Smith MA (1935). The Fauna of British India, Including Ceylon and Burma. Reptilia and Amphibia. Vol. II.—Sauria. London: Secretary of State for India in Council. (Taylor and Francis, Printers). xiii + 440 pp. + Plate I + 2 maps. (Phrynocephalus theobaldi, pp. 230–231).

theobaldi
Reptiles of China
Reptiles of India
Reptiles of Nepal
Fauna of Tibet
Taxa named by Edward Blyth
Reptiles described in 1863